The Audre Lorde Award is an annual literary award, presented by Publishing Triangle to honour works of lesbian poetry. First presented in 2001, the award was named in memory of American poet Audre Lorde.

Recipients

References

External links
 

Triangle Awards
American poetry awards
Awards established in 2001
LGBT poetry
Audre Lorde